The Whole of the Law is the ninth full-length studio album by British extreme metal band Anaal Nathrakh. It was released on 28 October 2016 on Metal Blade Records.

Background 
The lyrics to "Depravity Favours the Bold" are based on Au Lecteur (To the Reader), a poem by Charles Baudelaire. The song title "...So We Can Die Happy" comes from an interview with a young Syrian boy in which he said ‘If they want to use chemical weapons on us, they should just get on with it. But can they make them smell of bread so at least we can die happy?’ The album cover is a cropped and blackened version of the painting, Dante and Virgil, by William-Adolphe Bouguereau.

Track listing

Personnel

Anaal Nathrakh

 Dave Hunt (a.k.a. V.I.T.R.I.O.L.) – vocals
 Mick Kenney (a.k.a. Irrumator) – guitar, bass, programming, artwork, production

References

Anaal Nathrakh albums
2016 albums
Metal Blade Records albums